Rugby league is a minor team sport in Norway. The sport is administered there by Rugby League Norge, which was set up in late 2008. Rugby League Norge works according to RLEF and NIF laws.

History

Norway is new to the game. In February 2008, the Rugby League European Federation (RLEF) granted Norway official observer status, and in 2008 a committee was formed, based in Oslo, with the aim of developing the game all over the country.

The first rugby league event to take place on Norwegian soil was the Scandinavia Cup nine-a-side tournament in Oslo. Then a national team was selected to play against the British and Irish Student Pioneers. Norway lost this match 24–0. Later in the year, Norway played their first full international match, against Denmark in Copenhagen. Norway won the match 28–26.

In 2010 the first league season started in June, with a Grand Final won by Oslo RK, who defeated Lillestrøm Lions. Meanwhile, the Norwegian national team competed in their first official tournament, the 2010 European Bowl competition against Malta.

In 2011 it was hoped to see the domestic competition expand to five teams: Aker Seagulls (Oslo), Flisbyen Broncos (formerly Lillestrøm Lions), Fredrikstad Falcons, Oslo Capitals, and Tromsø Polar Bears. The 2011 Norwegian Grand Final is scheduled for September 10.

On 26 October 2011, Rugby League Norge was granted Affiliate status within the RLEF.

Domestic competition
Norway runs a senior men's competition with seven teams participating in the national 13-a-side championship:

Clubs
The following teams play in the 2022 competition.
 Lillestrøm Lions
 Oslo Capitals
 Sandnes Raiders
 Trondheim Rugbyklubb
 Haugesund Sea Eagles

Domestic competition champions

 2010 Oslo Capitals
 2011 Tromsø Polar Bears
 2012 Oslo Capitals
 2013 Oslo Capitals
 2014 Oslo Capitals
 2015 Bodø Barbarians
 2016 Trondheim Rugbyklubb/Flisbyen Broncos
 2017 Stavanger Storm
 2018 Stavanger Storm
 2019 Joint winners Stavanger Storm / Porsgrunn Pirates
 2021 Stavanger Storm

Media
In February 2011 Rugby League Norway announced a deal with TV 2 Sport for one game of the Engage Super League to be screened each week. In addition, a weekly timeslot was allocated to promote the fledgling domestic competition. The first Super League match ever screened live in Norway was the clash between St. Helens and Wigan Warriors. That match was played on Saturday February 12 at the Millennium Stadium in Cardiff as part of Millennium Magic.

In 2012 the Norwegian Grand Final was broadcast live on the Internet through NRK (Norsk Riks Kringkasting). This was a huge step towards showing people the game in Norway. In 2015 NRK again broadcast the Grand Final.

National team

Norway's national team is nicknamed "Vikingene". They first competed in 2009.

References

External links
 Rugby League Norge - Official Rugby League Norway website
 www.leagueunlimited.com: Rugby League's first steps in Norway Written by: RLEF Media Feb 11, 2007 1:31am
  
 www.rugbyleagueinternationalscores.com
 - Official website of the Oslo Capitals
 - Official website of Porsgrunn Pirates
 - Official website of Flekkefjord Tigers